Alberto Yarini y Ponce de León (1882-1910) was a Cuban racketeer and pimp during the period of the Cuban War of Independence against Spain. Yarini was well known in his time, is Cuba's most famous pimp, and came to symbolize the concept of Cubanidad, the Cuban national identity, to many Cubans, long after his death.

Yarini was born into an elite family, once owners of a Matanzas sugar plantations, with his father a dentist, and his uncle a medical surgeon, in Havana. He was educated in the United States, spoke fluent English as well as Spanish, and was politically well connected. He became known for importing prostitutes from France, and worked out of San Isidro, a barrio and red light district in Old Havana. He was killed on November 21, 1910, by gunfire from rival French pimp Louis Lotot and his confederates, who had been waiting for him. Lotot was himself killed in return gunfire from Yarini's bodyguard.

Legacy
Cuban composer Carlos Felipe Hernández wrote the 1960 musical theatre piece Réquiem por Yarini, about Yarini's life. Los Dioses Rotos (Fallen Gods), a 2009 film by Cuban filmmaker Ernesto Daranas, was based in part on Réquiem, and was a submission by Cuba to the 82nd Academy Awards for Best Foreign Language Film.

Yarini is the subject of an upcoming dramatic film, The Prince of Old Havana, by Cuban American writer, actress and director Migdia Chinea-Varela.

References

External links

 ALBERTO YARINI at Find A Grave 

Cuban criminals
Cuban pimps
Human trafficking in Cuba
1882 births
1910 deaths
Deaths by firearm in Cuba
19th-century Cuban people
People murdered in Cuba
Cuban murder victims